A Gate Through Bloodstained Mirrors is a 2001 demo by the American black metal one-man-band Xasthur. Reviews of that release, first published by Profane Productions as a limited CD-R edition of 150 copies, proved to be positive, comparing the material to old Graveland and Burzum. With the increasing cult status of Xasthur, the demo was reissued by Total Holocaust Records, featuring a different mix and track list (CD and cassette, 2004). This edition was also published as a double-12" vinyl release by Debemur Morti Productions (2004) and finally by Hydra Head Records (double-CD release, the second CD containing further rare material, 2008). The record is rumored to have influenced at least one suicide.

Track listing of the original demo (2001)
Intro – 01:16
Moon Shrouded in Misery, Part 1 – 6:46
Suicide in Dark Serenity – 10:39
Dwell Beneath the Woods of Evil – 5:14
Cursed Be the Memory of Light – 7:04
Possession of Desolate Magick – 5:40
Storms of Red Revenge – 4:16
A Spell Within the Winds – 4:34
Summon the End of Time – 4:52
Gate Through Bloodstained Mirrors – 8:32
Kingdom of Burning Crucifixions – 4:21
Moon Shrouded in Misery, Part 2 – 1:47
Black Spell of Destruction / Channeling the Power of Souls Into a New God – 7:34 Burzum cover.

Total Holocaust Records release (2004)
For this first official release as a regular CD, all the tracks of the demo (which was originally published in mono) were remixed in 2003. The remixed version was used for the vinyl and double-CD editions (2004 and 2008).

Track listing
Intro (1:25)
Moon Shrouded In Misery (Part I) – 7:19
Suicide In Dark Serenity – 12:27
Dwelling Beneath The Woods – 5:29
Cursed Be The Memory Of Light – 7:28
Possession Of Desolate Magick – 5:47
Spell Within The Winds – 4:47
Storms Of Red Revenge – 2:45
Eternal Empire Of Majesty Death – 7:17
A Gate Through Bloodstained Mirrors – 8:40
Kingdom Of Burning Crucifixions – 4:43
Moon Shrouded In Misery (Part II) – 2:09
Black Spell Of Destruction (Version I) – 6:14
Lost Behind Bloodstained Mirrors (Outro) – 0:45

Notes: Track 9 is a Mütiilation cover. Track 13 is a Burzum cover.

Release history

References

External links
 album page on Xasthur's official website
 album page on Encyclopaedia Metallum
 original release on discogs.com
 2004 CD reissue on discogs.com
 2004 double-vinyl reissue on discogs.com
 2008 double-CD reissue on discogs.com

Xasthur albums
2001 albums